Albert Harrison (19 August 1909 – 2 March 1989) was an English footballer.

Career
Harrison joined Port Vale as an amateur in September 1931, signing as a professional in November 1932. He played three Second Division games in the 1932–33 season and left The Old Recreation Ground on a free transfer to Leek Alexandra in May 1933.

Career statistics
Source:

References

Footballers from Stoke-on-Trent
English footballers
Association football midfielders
Port Vale F.C. players
English Football League players
1909 births
1989 deaths